Liu Mengmei (柳梦梅/柳夢梅) is the main fictionalized character within Tang Xianzu's play The Peony Pavilion, "Liu" meaning 'willow' and "Mengmei" 'dream of plum'. Mengmei was a descendant to the reputed poet Liu Zongyuan, Prefect of Liuzhou during the Tang dynasty period, and would be born into a family branch present within the District of Longnan. His father respectively held the title of Doctor-at-Large; his mother: Lady of the County. Having been orphaned at an early age and taken into the care of a gardener by the name of Camelback Guo, Mengmei rose from his place of residence by mid-adulthood, resolved to reach the capital prefecture of Guangzhou and complete the secondary examinations for political office. Two weeks prior to this resolution he experienced a dream in which had been present a woman of beautiful appearance standing beneath a flowering plum; this woman informed him that it is a credential for her to reach his side in love if his political aspirations are to be guaranteed with ultimate success. Subsequently, Mengmei chose to head to the Terrace of Prince Zhao Tao to see his friend Han Zicai, descendant of Han Yu, for the sake of discussing the course of his pilgrimage.

After having confronted his old friend Han Zicai, Mengmei learned that a man by the name of Secretary Miao, Imperial Commissioner for the Examination of Gems, was sympathetic in nature and a recipient of high rank, thus making him a more suitable patron than his initial caretaker Guo. Knowing that Miao would first assess gems in the Temple of the Many-jewelled in Guangzhou's Vale of Incense Mountains, and his tour of duty would meet its conclusion by the end of autumn, Mengmei accordingly reassured his friend that he would head to such a region with immediate pace. Upon returning to his estate he pondered for a time about the course that should be taken in retrospect to the dream he considered prophetical and the paramount suggestion presented by his old friend Han Zicai. After having confronted Camel Guo with the resolution to set out on his journey, Guo consented and packed whatever clothing that he deemed would be a necessity for Mengmei upon reaching the examination halls of Guangzhou, promising in return that he will watch for his "return in brocaded gown".

The Independent Journey
As Liu Mengmei continued his pilgrimage, he happened upon the Temple of the Many-jewelled, where upon lucky chance arrived the Imperial Inspector Miao Shunbin. Acting upon this opportunity unhesitatingly, Mengmei presented himself to the inspector's attendants, requesting an audience with their lord upon verifying a history of tantamount scholarship. As this request had been granted and the two individuals respectively greeted one another, Mengmei began examining the pearls and jewels beneath Miao's jurisdiction with heightened interest; and intent on further investigating the sourcing of this treasury, he was driven to ask what great distances had been traveled to gather such material. Furthering this, Mengmei romanticized the situation by attributing the pearls and jewels as  insensate without being able to present happiness; they can neither be used to feed the hungry nor cloth the naked. With this he then declared that his worth is in direct contrast: he is a pearl among men that would grant His Sacred Majesty with an un-priced bearing of treasure for the Court. Upon convincing Miao that he was indeed a man of talent but without the capacity to bear a one-thousand mile journey to Nan'an, the Imperial Inspector presented Mengmei with the necessary funds and a farewell toast of wine before seeing him on his way.

After having climbed Apricot Ridge Mengmei began to suffer from the intense cold wind borne by winter, which forthwith made him physically sick but nonetheless determined to carry on regardless of what weather presented itself. Approaching a frozen stream accompanied by a broken bridge, Mengmei had little other choice than to cling himself upon a willow tree in prospect of using it as a means of crossing; but when he had initially lost his balance and fell while amidst this attempt, he was forced to humiliatingly plea for help, upon which was answered by Chen Zuilang, who happened to be present nearby. As Mengmei began to elaborate the dilemmic circumstances that had been encountered upon being supported by his benefactor and exchanging a traditional code of thanks, he was instructed to head to a certain Apricot Shrine in which rest could be received before continuing any further form of travel—a suggestion that was taken initiative of.

Upon resting for some time at the Apricot Shrine Mengmei confronted the Abbess, Sister Stone, to inquire whether there exists a garden where he could amuse himself and effectively be cured from his present boredom. Successful in this inquiry and having received the necessary instructions for reaching his intended destination, Mengmei enjoyed what variable lengths of scenery stood before him, and upon further introspection, he had taken the initiative to open a small rosewood box that sat among a pile of boulders. Pulling from the box a portrait scroll, Mengmei concluded that such a representation was the bodhisattva Guanyin, and forthwith made preparations to bring it to his place of study in contrast to leaving it buried uncovetedly.

References

Characters in Chinese opera